Carora Airport  is an airport serving the city of Carora in the Lara state of Venezuela.

The Carora VOR-DME (Ident: COR) and non-directional beacon (Ident: COR) are located on the field.

See also
Transport in Venezuela
List of airports in Venezuela

References

External links
OpenStreetMap - Carora
OurAirports - Carora
SkyVector - Carora Airport

Airports in Venezuela